Arethusa Falls is a waterfall in the White Mountains of New Hampshire in the United States. The waterfall occurs when the headwaters of Bemis Brook tumble over a granite cliff on the western slope of Crawford Notch. Arethusa holds the distinction of being the tallest single-drop waterfall in New Hampshire; some high-angle cascades surpass it in height, such as the Mahoosuc Range's seasonal Dryad Falls.

Arethusa Falls was discovered by Edward Tuckerman in 1875. It was named after the nymph Arethusa, daughter of Nereus.

The falls are located within Crawford Notch State Park and are accessible by means of the  Arethusa Falls Trail from U.S. Route 302.

References

External links
Crawford Notch State Park Hiking Information, including map and trail description to Arethusa Falls

Waterfalls of New Hampshire
White Mountains (New Hampshire)
Landforms of Carroll County, New Hampshire
Protected areas of Carroll County, New Hampshire
White Mountain National Forest